Elijah Boardman (March 7, 1760 – August 18, 1823) was an American politician who served as a senator from Connecticut. Born to a noted and politically connected Connecticut family, he served in the Connecticut militia before becoming a noted merchant and businessman. Becoming involved in property and land ownership in Connecticut and Ohio, he founded the towns of Boardman and Medina in Ohio. His involvement in politics also increased, and he gradually rose through the ranks of the local, and then national government, being elected by the Connecticut legislature to the United States Senate. He served as Senator from Connecticut until his death in Ohio.

Biography

Early life
Boardman, was born in New Milford in Connecticut, the third of four children for Deacon Sherman Boardman (1728–1814) and Sarah Bostwick Boardman (1730–1818). His father, son of the first minister of the Congregational Church, was a "prosperous farmer", well educated and well versed in local politics – he was 21 times elected as a member of the General Assembly of Connecticut – and was familiar with "civil and military concerns of the town." The Boardman family were the town's founding family, and lived on a "substantial farm" on the Housatonic River.

A biographer of his later wife wrote of Elijah Boardman: "Inheriting many of the good qualities of his father and his grandfather, he combined, with those good qualities, the energy and intrepidity of his mother and of his grandmother, respecting both of whom there are preserved family traditions of much historical and domestic interest." The biographer also noted Boardman to be "dignified" in personal appearance, and handsome. His brother, David Sherman Boardman, remarked that he was "inclined" to hilarity. Elijah Boardman was educated by private tutors – including tutoring in Latin by the Reverend Nathaniel Taylor and other matters by his own mother – at home before enlisting in the Connecticut militia to serve in the American Revolutionary War as a "common soldier", in March 1776 aged 16.

Revolutionary War

Under Captain Isaac Bostwick, Boardman served in one of the first sixteen regiments raised by the Continental Congress under the command of Colonel Charles Webb. Boardman was directed to Boston, and diverted to New London and New York City, where he took part in Battle of Long Island, however after defeat there and American evacuation to Washington, he was confined to a sick bed having exacerbated childhood medical difficulties and fever. After six months, having achieved an ultimate rank of sergeant, he obtained passage on a wagon back to New York, where he was discovered in poor health by a friend of his father, who sent word home for Boardman to be collected. Meanwhile, Boardman obtained a discharge from the army.

In the summer of 1777, Sir Henry Clinton led British forces through Fort Montgomery and prompted a call-up of Connecticut militia, which Boardman joined until the danger passed following the surrender of General Burgoyne, whereupon the militia was disbanded. Now detached from the army, Boardman resumed his tutorship under John Hickling, a family tutor employed by Boardman's father.

Mercantile employment

In 1781, Boardman took work as a clerk and as a merchant. He spent time employed in New Haven, training as a shopkeeper in the store of Elijah and Archibald Austin, before setting up his own company in his home town of New Milford later that same year. This business, a dry-goods store, was operated in conjunction with his two brothers, David and Daniel. As part of his travels, he visited Ohio, where he founded the town of Boardman. In 1789, he was the subject of a portrait by Ralph Earl, which "portrayed the richly dressed dry goods merchant... in his store in New Milford... through the open door, bolts of textiles tell the viewer how Boardman earned a living." Earl's most "accomplished" and successful series of paintings were of the Boardman family. Boardman became the largest slave owner in his hometown of New Milford; According to the 1790 United States census, he owned six slaves. Boardman then married Mary Anna Whiting on September 25, 1792, for whom he would build '', which still stands in New Milford. By this time, he had also opened a second shop outside of any partnership with his brothers, which was situated in Litchfield County and was designed by architect William Sprats, and on October 10, 1794 his first son, William Whiting Boardman, was born.

In September 1795, Boardman became a member of the Connecticut Land Company, and a purchaser of the Connecticut Western Reserve – now part of northern Ohio – which entitled Boardman and his associates to two townships located there, one of which being Medina. The  site set aside to create a county seat was originally named Mecca, until it was realised that a nearby town was named the same. Boardman's land agent, Rufus Ferris Sr., became the first resident of Medina, Together with his brothers, Boardman had thus became the owner of a "considerable" amount of real estate, among the post-Revolutionary War landed gentry "among the town's highest taxpayers."

Politics
Boardman's initial ventures into politics are recorded in a letter to then-President Thomas Jefferson on June 18, 1801. He included a sermon of the Rev. Stanley Griswold, of the New Milford church, which discussed the new President as "an example of how evil could be overcome by good." Jefferson subsequently replied with a detailed critique of the sermon.

Boardman became a member of the State House of Representatives for the period 1803–05 and again in 1816, before becoming a member of the State's upper house between 1817–1819, and a member of the State Senate between 1819–1821. On March 4, 1821, he was elected to the US Senate while living in Litchfield, Connecticut. He is listed by the Abridgment of the Debates of Congress, from 1789 to 1856 as having been present at Senate proceedings on December 3, 1821, in Washington DC in the company of Class-3 Connecticut senator James Lanman.

Later life and death

Boardman served in the Senate until his death during a visit to his son, whereupon he was succeeded by Henry W. Edwards. His cause of death is a subject of speculation, however biographer and son-in-law John Frederick Schroeder (m. Caroline Maria Boardman) related it while writing in 1849 to several bouts of cholera and fever Boardman had suffered throughout his life, particularly during a tour of Rhode Island in 1780, as well as other attacks in Vermont and New Hampshire throughout his life. Senator James Lanman proposed on December 5, 1823, a motion for the members of the Senate to wear "the usual mourning" for thirty days to commemorate his death. Boardman's body was returned home and interred in New Milford. He was survived by his first son, later politician William, and his second, Henry Mason Boardman. Mabel Thorp Boardman, American philanthropist, was his great-granddaughter.

See also
List of United States Congress members who died in office (1790–1899)

Notes

References

External links

 Elijah Boardman's Portrait by Ralph Earl at the Metropolitan Museum of Art

|-

1760 births
1823 deaths
18th-century American businesspeople
19th-century American businesspeople
American people of English descent
American slave owners
Businesspeople from Connecticut
Connecticut Democratic-Republicans
Connecticut Land Company
Connecticut militiamen in the American Revolution
Connecticut state senators
Democratic-Republican Party United States senators from Connecticut
Members of the Connecticut General Assembly Council of Assistants (1662–1818)
Military personnel from Connecticut
People from Boardman, Ohio
People from New Milford, Connecticut
People of colonial Connecticut
People of Connecticut in the American Revolution
United States senators who owned slaves